The Bethungra Spiral is a heritage-listed rail spiral near Bethungra, between Junee and Cootamundra, carrying the northbound track of the Melbourne → Sydney railway line.

It is a listed heritage item, having been added to the New South Wales State Heritage Register on 2 April 1999.

History 
The original single-track line, opened in 1878, was graded at 1 in 40 for Sydney bound trains, which imposed a severe limitation on train loads and also caused congestion as bank engines were attached and detached.

When the line was duplicated in the late 1940s, an 8.9 kilometre spiral deviation was built. The spiral makes use of local geography in the shape of a convenient hill around which the uphill ("up", or Sydney-bound) track spirals in order to gain the necessary height over a longer distance, thus giving a lesser gradient. However, the fact that the hill is on the "down" (southbound) side of the original track necessitated two crossings of the original line by the new northbound track — one a tunnel to take it to the eastern (or "down") side of the original track in order to then spiral around the hill, and a viaduct beyond the spiral to take the new track back to the left hand side of the original line, as Australian trains run on the left, as in the UK, France and Japan. The Spiral has two short tunnels, one already mentioned at the beginning of the Spiral, for the "up" track to cross beneath the original line to reach the "down" side, and a second tunnel that allows it to pass over itself at a later point in the Spiral, having circled the hill to gain height.

The spiral increased the distance travelled by uphill (northbound) trains by about two kilometres. Downhill (southbound) trains continue to use the original line. The ruling gradient of the new uphill line is 1 in 66.

Due to the extensive blasting required to create 27-metre deep cuts through granite, the line suffers from rockfalls, with twelve significant falls happening between 1960 and 1987. In January 1994, the spiral line closed for a four-month rebuild, which saw the cuts widened and regraded to benched 55 degree slopes as part of the One Nation project.

Description

Starting at the lower left corner of the interactive map, the "up" track to Cootamundra (and thence to Sydney) is the one on the left. It diverges from the "down" track and has been built at a less steep gradient than the "down" track and so is able to pass under it (through a tunnel) then sweeping around the hill (passing through the second tunnel in the process), gaining elevation all the while until crossing over itself above the second tunnel. It is now higher than the down track and on its right (if northbound), and at an overpass further north (click on "Full screen" to view), crosses back over to the left and eventually the two tracks converge just short of the Olympic Highway level crossing.

Heritage listing 
The Bethungra Spiral is of high significance, illustrating a means of ascending a significant mountain range with easier grades than the original line (now the "down" track).  It is a major civil work and an ingenious engineering solution using the technology available at the time of construction.  The site has major landscape value.

Bethungra Spiral was listed on the New South Wales State Heritage Register on 2 April 1999 having satisfied the following criteria:
The place possesses uncommon, rare or endangered aspects of the cultural or natural history of New South Wales.
This item is assessed as historically rare.  This item is assessed as scientifically rare.  This item is assessed as architecturally rare.

Tourism

A traveller who has just passed through Bethungra township on the way to Cootamundra is alerted to its existence nearby by a sign indicating the turnoff to the Rail Spiral Lookout and Bethungra Dam on the right of the Olympic Highway.
An all-vehicle dirt road leads, after about 3km, to a parking area and interpretive signboard. Nearby is the substantial viewing platform from where man be seen the Sydney-bound train emerge from the tunnel and two minutes later cross over that same tunnel.

There are other spots on that road from where three railway tracks can be seen at three different heights on the adjacent hillside to the east of the Olympic Highway. The bottom and top tracks are the "up" (northbound) track before and after it has crossed the "down" (southbound) track and traversed the Spiral, while the middle track is the original single-track line, which is now the "down" (southbound) track.

Inland Rail
The route of the proposed Inland Rail entails a new section of line from Illabo, west of Bethungra, to Stockinbingal, to obviate the need for northbound trains on the Inland Railway to climb the Bethungra Spiral to Cootamundra then drop down to Stockinbingal to continue north towards Forbes then Parkes. It is projected that this section of the Inland Railway will be completed by 2025. The Spiral will remain in use as part of the Melbourne-Sydney line.

Model railway

The Epping Model Railway Club, of Epping, New South Wales, has created a detailed model of the spiral in HO scale.

Gallery

References

Attribution

External links

Trip Advisor

Rail infrastructure in New South Wales
Railway tunnels in New South Wales
New South Wales State Heritage Register
Bethungra, New South Wales
Articles incorporating text from the New South Wales State Heritage Register
Main Southern railway line, New South Wales